The cuboideonavicular joint is a joint (articulation) in the foot formed between the navicular bone and cuboid bone.
The navicular bone is connected with the cuboid bone by the dorsal, plantar, and interosseous cuboideonavicular ligaments. It is a syndesmosis type fibrous joint.

The dorsal ligaments 
The dorsal cuboideonavicular ligament connects the lateral portion of the navicular to the posteromedial portion of the cuboid on the dorsal side.

The plantar ligaments
The plantar cuboideonavicular ligaments have a similar arrangement to the dorsal, and are strengthened by slips from the tendon of the tibialis posterior.

Synovial membrane
The synovial membrane of this joints is part of the great tarsal synovial membrane.

Movements
The movements at this joint are slight gliding and rotation. Mere gliding movements are permitted between the navicular and cuneiform bones.

References

Lower limb anatomy
Joints